Bakari T. Sellers (born September 18, 1984) is an American attorney, political commentator, and politician. He served in the South Carolina House of Representatives for the 90th District from 2006-2014.

Sellers represented South Carolina's 90th district in the lower house of the state legislature from 2006 to 2014, becoming the youngest African American elected official in the country at age 22. He vacated his seat in the South Carolina House of Representatives to run for Lieutenant Governor in 2014, but lost to Henry McMaster. He was succeeded in the House by Justin T. Bamberg.

Sellers is currently a political analyst on CNN.  He is also a paid lobbyist for the government of Liberia.

Early life and education
Sellers was born on September 18, 1984, and is the son of Gwendolyn Sellers and civil rights activist and professor Cleveland Sellers. He grew up in Bamberg County, South Carolina, and was educated at Orangeburg-Wilkinson High School, a public high school in Orangeburg, South Carolina. In 2005, Sellers earned a bachelor's degree in African-American Studies from Morehouse College, a private all-male and historically black, liberal arts college, in Atlanta, Georgia. In 2008, he earned a juris doctor from the University of South Carolina School of Law. Sellers has worked for Congressman James Clyburn and former Atlanta Mayor Shirley Franklin.

Career

Legal career
Sellers has been an attorney with the Strom Law Firm, L.L.C. in Columbia, South Carolina since 2007, He is also currently on the board of directors of Level Brands (a brand management firm) and Let America Vote (a voting rights organization founded by former Missouri Secretary of State Jason Kander).

Zionist advocacy
Sellers first attended the annual AIPAC conference while serving as a student body president at Morehouse College. He has since become a prominent African-American Zionist. In 2016, he authored a letter signed by 60 fellow African-American politicians urging the Democratic Platform Committee to keep the same language, refusing to include the statement that Israel is engaging in an "occupation" of Palestine that appeared in previous Democratic platforms.

2019 Lincoln Memorial tweet 

In response to an incident between a teenager, Nicholas Sandmann, and Native American activist Nathan Phillips at the Lincoln Memorial, Sellers tweeted about the teen: "He is a deplorable. Some ppl can also be punched in the face." Sellers deleted the tweet, claiming his comment was "metaphoric" and "taken out of context" though he still claimed that the students "displayed xenophobic, racist behavior." Sellers was later included in a lawsuit brought by the teen's parents against CNN, where Sellers worked as an analyst.  CNN settled the lawsuit, rather than face a court trial.

Honors, awards, and books
In 2010, Time magazine featured Sellers on its 40 Under 40 list. In 2012, Politico named Sellers on its "50 politicos to watch" list.

Sellers was named HBCU Top 30 Under 30 in July 2014.

In May 2020, Sellers released an autobiography, My Vanishing Country, that centers on the forgotten lives of African-American working-class people in the rural U.S. South.

Personal life
In the summer of 2015, he married Ellen Rucker Carter, chiropractor and co-owner of Rucker Roots haircare products. He has twins, a boy and a girl, born in 2018.

References

External links
South Carolina Legislature - Representative Bakari T. Sellers, official SC House website
Project Vote Smart - Representative Bakari Sellers (SC) profile
Follow the Money - Bakari Sellers
2006 campaign contributions

1984 births
African-American lawyers
African-American state legislators in South Carolina
CNN people
Living people
Democratic Party members of the South Carolina House of Representatives
Morehouse College alumni
People from Denmark, South Carolina
South Carolina lawyers
University of South Carolina School of Law alumni
Orangeburg-Wilkinson High School alumni
21st-century African-American people
20th-century African-American people